Sasha Enters Life is a 1957 remake of the 1956 film Tight Knot, a Soviet drama film directed by Mikhail Schweitzer. In 1988 the original film was restored under the original name, Tight Knot.

Plot 
The chairman of the collective farm takes Sasha Komelev, the son of the dead secretary of the district committee, to his house. Sasha not only began to work hard, but also went to college. He spends his free time with a girl named Katya, but she preferred the new secretary of the district party committee. The latter turns out to be a careerist who does not care about collective farms of the district, but Katya does not believe this.

Cast 
 Oleg Tabakov as Sasha Komelev
 Viktor Avdyushko as Pavel Mansurov
 Nikolai Sergeyev as Ignat Gmyzin
 Ivan Pereverzev as Party Leader
 Vladimir Yemelyanov as Party Leader
 Pavel Volkov as Murgin, collective farm chairman
 Valentina Pugachyova as Katya Zelentsova
 Valentina Berezutskaya as Nastya Baklushina
 Antonina Bogdanova as wife Gmyzina
 Yuriy Medvedev as Meshkov
 Svetlana Konovalova as Anna Mansurova
 Yelena Maksimova as Sasha's mother
 Maya Bulgakova	
 Oleg Yefremov
 Valentina Vladimirova as Pozdnyakova

Reviews
 Andrei Plakhov: Another landmark work on the ideological shelf should be considered the Tight Knot by Mikhail Schweitzer, where the criticism of the collective-farm order was clearly too acute for the Khrushchev Thaw to begin with. The film was savagely rewired and released under the idiotic title Sasha Enters Life, which forever discouraged Schweitzer from making a keen social film, and he devoted himself to screen versions of the classics.
  Maya Turovskaya: Tabakov with a good and authentic artlessness conveyed the first desperate grief and uncontrollable immediate joy of his seventeen years, his infantile maturity, touching disturbances of the first failed love and breaking boyish principles, all watercolor and tender play of a barely feminine, shy and direct character. But the actor in it has not yet groped his theme.

References

External links 
 
  Меня как будто кто-то подменил: Памяти Олега Табакова

1956 films
1950s Russian-language films
Soviet black-and-white films
Mosfilm films
Soviet drama films
1956 drama films
Films directed by Mikhail Shveytser